The list of acts of the 105th United States Congress includes all Acts of Congress and ratified treaties by the 105th United States Congress, which lasted from January 3, 1997 to January 3, 1999.

Acts include public and private laws, which are enacted after being passed by Congress and signed by the President, however if the President vetoes a bill it can still be enacted by a two-thirds vote in both houses. The Senate alone considers treaties, which are ratified by a two-thirds vote.

Summary of actions

President William J. Clinton vetoed the following acts of this Congress. (List of United States presidential vetoes#Bill Clinton).

 June 9, 1997: Vetoed , Supplemental Appropriations and Recissions Act, FY 1997. No override attempt made.
 October 10, 1997: Vetoed , the second attempted partial birth abortion ban. Overridden by House, 296–132 (286 needed). Override attempt failed in Senate, 64–36 (67 needed).
 November 13, 1997: Vetoed , a line item veto override bill.[29] Overridden by House, 347–69 (278 needed). Overridden by Senate, 78–20 (66 needed), and enacted as Pub.L. 105–159 over the president's veto.
 May 20, 1998: Vetoed , District of Columbia Student Opportunity Scholarship Act of 1997. No override attempt made
 June 23, 1998: Vetoed , Temporary Increase in the Statutory Debt Limit.  No override attempt made.
 July 21, 1998: Vetoed , Education Savings and School Excellence Act of 1998. No override attempt made.
 October 7, 1998: Vetoed , Foreign Affairs Reform and Restructuring Act of 1998. No override attempt made.
 October 21, 1998: Vetoed , Foreign Affairs Reform and Restructuring Act of 1998. No override attempt made.

Public laws

Private laws

Treaties
No treaties have been enacted this Congress.

See also 
List of United States federal legislation
List of acts of the 104th United States Congress
List of acts of the 106th United States Congress

References

External links

 Authenticated Public and Private Laws from the Federal Digital System
 Legislation & Records Home: Treaties from the Senate
 Public Laws for the 105th Congress at Congress.gov
 Private Laws for the 105th Congress at Congress.gov

 
105